Lake Clinch is a natural freshwater lake on the west side of Frostproof, Florida. Residences surround much of this lake. This lake apparently has no public swimming areas or but it has a public boat ramp on the southwest side of Frostproof. The city of Frostproof has a public park on its eastern shore.

References

Lakes of Polk County, Florida